Thüringer Handball Club Erfurt-Bad Langensalza e. V is a German women's handball team from Erfurt and Bad Langensalza. The club has its seat in Erfurt and plays the home matches in the Salza-Halle in Bad Langensalza. They compete in the Handball-Bundesliga Frauen, the top division in Germany.

Kits

Honours
Handball-Bundesliga Frauen:
Winners (7): 2011, 2012, 2013, 2014, 2015, 2016, 2018
DHB-Pokal:
Winners (2): 2011, 2013, 2019
EHF Challenge Cup:
Finalists (1): 2009

Team

Current squad
Squad for the 2022–23 season

Goalkeepers
 1  Laura Kuske
 12  Irma Schjött
 16  Nicole Roth
Wingers
LW
 7  Yuki Tanabe
 18  Johanna Stockschläder
RW
 6  Nathalie Hendrikse
 8  Dominika Zachová

Line players
 10  Sara Rønningen 
 11  Vilma Matthijs Holmberg
 57  Josefine Huber (injured)

Back players
LB
 14  Anika Niederwieser
 21  Annika Lott
 29  Johanna Reichert

CB
 5  Sonja Frey
 9  Madeleine Hilby
RB
 4  Nikoline Lundgreen
 43  Jennifer Rode
 27  Lydia Jakubisova

Transfers 
Transfers for the 2023–24 season:

 Joining

 Leaving
  Laura Kuske (GK) (to  Buxtehuder SV)

Notable former players

  Dinah Eckerle (2009–2018)
  Meike Schmelzer (2014–2021)
  Svenja Huber (2013–2016)
  Anja Althaus (2012–2014)
  Franziska Mietzner (2013–2015)
  Ewgenija Minevskaja (2005–2013)
  Nadja Nadgornaja (2010–2015)
  Jana Krause (2013–2020)
  Nina Müller (2018–2019)
  Kerstin Wohlbold (2010–2021)
  Saskia Lang (2017–2019)
  Alicia Stolle (2018–2020)
  Emily Bölk (2018–2020)
  Anne Hubinger (2017–2019)
  Nora Reiche (2010–2012)
  Isabell Roch (2006–2008)
  Alexandra Mazzucco (2017–2020)
  Ann-Cathrin Giegerich (2018–2020)
  Ina Großmann (2018–2021)
  Willemijn Karsten (2011–2012)
  Pearl van der Wissel (2010–2011)
  Danick Snelder (2010–2016)
  Martine Smeets (2013–2015)
  Anouk van de Wiel (2015–2017)
  Anouk Nieuwenweg (2020)
  Rinka Duijndam (2021–2022)
  Crina Pintea (2015–2017)
  Eliza Buceschi (2015–2016)
  Melinda Geiger (2012)
  Petra Blazek (2020–2022)
  Katrin Engel (2011–2017)
  Sonja Frey (2012–2016, 2022–)
  Macarena Aguilar (2016–2018)
  Alexandrina Cabral (2013–2014)
  Almudena Rodriguez (2019–2020)
  Szimonetta Planéta (2016–2017)
  Krisztina Triscsuk (2018–2019)
  Luca Szekerczés (2021–2022)
  Iveta Korešová (2013–2021)
  Markéta Jeřábková (2020–2021)
  Mie Augustesen (2012–2013)
  Annika Meyer (2021–2022)
  Mikaela Mässing (2019–2020)
  Emma Ekenman-Fernis (2020–2022)
  Lýdia Jakubisová (2011–2022)
  Ana Gros (2012–2013)
  Manon Houette (2016–2017)
  Marie Davidsen (2019–2021)
  Yuliya Snopova (2014–2015)
  Katarina Tomašević (2012–2013)
  Anika Niederwieser (2016–2018)
  Patricia Batista da Silva (2017–2018)
  Lamprini Tsàkalou (2021–2022)
  Ines Khouildi (2020–2022)
  Aslı İskit (2020–2022)
  Kerstin Kündig (2020–2022)

Head coach history

European record

EHF Champions League

EHF European League

EHF Challenge Cup

External links
 Official site
 

German handball clubs
Handball clubs established in 2000
Women's handball clubs
Women's handball in Germany
Sport in Thuringia